The World Rugby Awards are given out annually by World Rugby (until November 2014, known as the International Rugby Board), the worldwide governing body for rugby union, for major achievements in the sport. The idea of rewarding excellence in rugby was disclosed in 2001 following the Annual Meeting of the International Rugby Board Council in Copenhagen, and the first ceremony was first awarded later that year. The International Rugby Players' Association also gives out awards, for Try of the Year (since 2007), and Special Merit, as a part of the programme. As of 2021, they now present Women's Try of the Year.

In 2020, World Rugby decided to "look back on a decade of international rugby" instead of presenting the usual awards. Six of the categories were decided by fan votes and two by a selected panel. The 'Special Edition Awards' focused on "...members of the rugby family who had showcased solidarity during the COVID-19 pandemic, supporting their communities and getting involved in relief efforts."

World Rugby reintroduced the normal awards in 2021 with a few new additions. Unlike previous years where a majority of the awards were selected by an independent panel, half of the categories will now be selected by public voting.

2001
IRB Player of the Year: Keith Wood 
IRB International Team of the Year: 
IRB International Coach of the Year: Rod Macqueen 
IRB International Young Player of the Year: Gavin Henson 
IRB International Women's Player of the Year: Shelley Rae 
IRB Referee Award for Distinguished Service: Ed Morrison 
IRB Spirit of Rugby Award: Tim Grandadge 
IRB Distinguished Service Award: Tom Kiernan 
IRB Development Award: Jorge Brasceras 
IRB Chairman's Awards: Kath McLean, Sir Terry McLean, Albert Ferrasse, John Eales

2002
IRB Player of the Year: Fabien Galthié 
IRB International Team of the Year: 
IRB International Coach of the Year: Bernard Laporte 
IRB International U19 Player of the Year: Luke McAlister 
IRB International U21 Player of the Year: Pat Barnard 
IRB International Sevens Team of the Year: 
IRB International Women's Player of the Year: Monique Hirovanaa 
IRB Referee Award for Distinguished Service: Colin Hawke 
IRB Distinguished Services Award: Allan Hosie 
IRB Spirit of Rugby Award: Old Christians Club 
IRB Development Award: John Broadfoot 
IRB Chairman's Awards: Bill Mclaren, George Pippos (posthumously)

2003
IRB International Player of the Year: Jonny Wilkinson 
IRB International Team of the Year: 
IRB International Coach of the Year: Sir Clive Woodward 
IRB International U19 Player of the Year: Jean Baptiste Payras 
IRB International U21 Player of the Year: Ben Atiga 
IRB International Sevens Team of the Year: 
IRB Spirit of Rugby Award: Michael & Linda Collinson 
IRB Award for Distinguished Service: Bob Stuart 
IRB Referee Distinguished Service Award: Derek Bevan 
IRB International Women's Personality of the Year: Kathy Flores 
IRB Development Award: Tan Theany & Philippe Monnin
IRB Chairman's Award: Vernon Pugh

2004
IRB International Player of the Year: Schalk Burger 
IRB International Team of the Year: 
IRB International Coach of the Year: Jake White 
IRB International U19 Player of the Year: Jeremy Thrush 
IRB International U21 Player of the Year: Jerome Kaino 
IRB International Sevens Team of the Year: 
IRB International Sevens Player of the Year: Simon Amor 
IRB Spirit of Rugby Award: Jarrod Cunningham 
Vernon Pugh Award for Distinguished Service: Ronnie Dawson 
IRB Referee Award for Distinguished Service: Jim Fleming 
IRB International Women's Personality of the Year: Donna Kennedy 
IRB Development Award: Guedel Ndiaye 
IRB Chairman's Award: Marcel Martin

2005
IRB International Player of the Year: Daniel Carter 
IRB International Team of the Year: 
IRB International Coach of the Year: Graham Henry 
IRB International U19 Player of the Year: Isaia Toeava 
IRB International U21 Player of the Year: Tatafu Polota-Nau 
IRB International Sevens Team of the Year: 
IRB International Sevens Player of the Year: Orene Ai’i 
IRB Spirit of Rugby Award: Jean Pierre Rives 
Vernon Pugh Award for Distinguished Service: Peter Crittle 
IRB Referee Award for Distinguished Service: Paddy O'Brien 
IRB International Women's Personality of the Year: Farah Palmer 
IRB Development Award: Robert Antonin 
IRB Chairman's Award: Sir Tasker Watkins V.C., G.B.E, D.L

2006
IRB International Player of the Year: Richie McCaw, 
IRB International Team of the Year: 
IRB International Coach of the Year: Graham Henry, 
IRB International U19 Player of the Year: Josh Holmes 
IRB International U21 Player of the Year: Lionel Beauxis 
IRB International Sevens Team of the Year: 
IRB International Sevens Player of the Year: Uale Mai 
IRB Spirit of Rugby Award: Polly Miller
Vernon Pugh Award for Distinguished Service: Brian Lochore 
IRB Referee Award for Distinguished Service: Peter Marshall 
IRB International Women's Personality of the Year: Margaret Alphonsi 
IRB Development Award: Mike Luke 
IRB Hall of Fame inductees: William Webb Ellis and Rugby School

2007
IRB International Player of the Year: Bryan Habana, 
IRB International Team of the Year: 
IRB International Coach of the Year: Jake White, 
IRB Under-19 Player of the Year: Robert Fruean, 
IRB Sevens Player of the Year: Afeleke Pelenise, 
IRB Sevens Team of the Year: 
IRB Women's Personality of the Year: Sarah Corrigan, referee,  Australia
IRB Referee Award for Distinguished Service: Dick Byres, retired,  Australia
After refereeing 14 Tests, he was a charter member of the IRB Referee Selector panel when it was formed in 1997, and was the longest-serving member of the panel when he retired in 2007.
Vernon Pugh Award for Distinguished Service: José María Epalza, 
Spirit of Rugby Award: Nicolas Pueta, 
Pueta regularly plays club rugby despite having a congenital femoral deficiency that meant that his left leg never grew to the same size as his right one.
IRPA Try of the Year: Takudzwa Ngwenya, 
IRPA Special Merit Award: Fabien Pelous, 
Pelous is the most-capped player in France history, and also the most-capped lock ever.
IRB Development Award: Jacob Thompson,  Jamaica
Ever since returning home to Jamaica from England in the 1970s, Thompson has tirelessly worked to promote the sport in his homeland. He has been president of the Jamaica Rugby Union since 1999.
IRB Hall of Fame inductees:
Pierre de Coubertin, 
Wilson Whineray, 
Danie Craven,  South Africa
Gareth Edwards, 
John Eales,

2008
IRB Player of the Year: Shane Williams, 
IRB International Team of the Year: 
IRB International Coach of the Year: Graham Henry, 
IRB Junior Player of the Year: Luke Braid, 
IRB International Sevens Player of the Year: DJ Forbes, 
IRB Spirit of Rugby Award: Roelien Muller and Patrick Cotter
IRB Referee Award for Distinguished Service: Andre Watson 
IRB International Women's Personality of the Year: Carol Isherwood 
IRPA Special Merit Award: Agustín Pichot 
IRB Development Award: TAG Rugby Development Trust and Martin Hansford 
IRPA Try of the Year: Brian O'Driscoll

2009
IRB Player of the Year: Richie McCaw 
IRB International Team of the Year: 
IRB International Coach of the Year: Declan Kidney (Ireland)
IRB Junior Player of the Year: Aaron Cruden 
IRB International Sevens Player of the Year: Ollie Phillips 
IRB Spirit of Rugby Award: L'Aquila Rugby 
The town of L'Aquila, with long rugby traditions, was hit on 6 April 2009 by an earthquake which left 307 people dead and tens of thousands homeless. Amongst the victims was promising young prop Lorenzo Sebastiani, who had played in the last IRB Junior World Championship in Wales. L'Aquila Rugby Club provided shelter, refuge and comfort to people in the town. L'Aquila's Rugby were in the front line of the rescue effort, and helped evacuate victims from damaged buildings.
IRB Referee Award for Distinguished Service: to be awarded
IRB International Women's Personality of the Year: Debby Hodgkinson 
IRPA Special Merit Award: Kevin Mac Clancy
IRB Development Award: 林嘉生 Lin, Chia-Sheng(Carlson Lin) 
Mr Lin was the first person from Asian countries to receive this award, for his decades of dedication to promote rugby sport in Taiwan, and also his selfless contribution to the world rugby society.
IRPA Try of the Year: Jaque Fourie

2010
IRB Player of the Year: Richie McCaw 
IRB International Team of the Year: 
IRB International Coach of the Year: Graham Henry 
IRB Junior Player of the Year: Julian Savea 
IRB International Sevens Player of the Year: Mikaele Pesamino 
 Vernon Pugh Award for Distinguished Service: Jean-Claude Baqué 
 IRB Spirit of Rugby Award: Virreyes RC 
 IRB Women's Personality of the Year Carla Hohepa 
 IRB Development Award winner Brian O'Shea  
 IRB Referee Award for Distinguished Service Colin High
 IRPA Try of the Year: Chris Ashton

2011
 IRB Player of the Year: Thierry Dusautoir 
 IRB International Team of the Year: 
 IRB International Coach of the Year: Graham Henry 
 IRB Junior Player of the Year: George Ford 
 IRB International Sevens Player of the Year: Cecil Afrika 
 Vernon Pugh Award for Distinguished Service: Jock Hobbs 
 IRB Spirit of Rugby Award: Wooden Spoon Society United Kingdom
 IRB Women's Personality of the Year: Ruth Mitchell
 IRB Development Award winner: Rookie Rugby  USA
 IRB Referee Award for Distinguished Service: Keith Lawrence 
 IRPA Special Merit Award: George Smith 
 IRPA Try of the Year: Radike Samo 
 IRB Hall of Fame inductees:
Roger Vanderfield 
Richard Littlejohn 
Nicholas Shehadie 
John Kendall-Carpenter 
David Kirk 
Nick Farr-Jones 
Francois Pienaar 
Martin Johnson 
John Smit 
Brian Lochore 
Bob Dwyer 
Kitch Christie 
Rod Macqueen 
Clive Woodward 
Jake White 
Gareth Rees 
Agustín Pichot 
Brian Lima 
Jonah Lomu

2012
 IRB Player of the Year: Dan Carter 
 IRB International Team of the Year: 
 IRB International Coach of the Year: Steve Hansen 
 IRB International Sevens Player of the Year: Tomasi Cama 
 IRB Development Award: South African Rugby Union 
 IRB Referee Award for Distinguished Service: Paul Dobson 
 IRB Junior Player of the Year: Jan Serfontein 
 Vernon Pugh Award for Distinguished Service: Viorel Morariu 
 IRB Spirit of Rugby Award: Lindsay Hilton 
 IRPA Try of the Year: Bryan Habana 
 IRB Hall of Fame inductees:
 IRB Women’s Player of the Year: Michaela Staniford

2013
 IRB Player of the Year: Kieran Read 
 IRB International Team of the Year: 
 IRB International Coach of the Year: Steve Hansen 
 IRB Sevens Player of the Year: Tim Mikkelson 
 IRB Women's Sevens Player of the Year: Kayla McAlister 
 IRB Referee Award for Distinguished Service: Michel Lamoulie 
 IRPA Try of the Year: Beauden Barrett

2014
Note: Some of the awards for this year were presented before 19 November, when the International Rugby Board changed its name to the current World Rugby.

 World Rugby Player of the Year: Brodie Retallick 
 World Rugby Team of the Year: 
 World Rugby Coach of the Year: Steve Hansen 
 IRB Sevens Player of the Year: Samisoni Viriviri 
 IRB Women's Player of the Year: Magali Harvey 
 IRB Women's Sevens Player of the Year: Emilee Cherry 
 IRB Junior Player of the Year: Handré Pollard 
 IRB Referee Award for Distinguished Service: Bob Francis 
 IRPA Try of the Year: Francois Hougaard

2015
 World Rugby Player of the Year: Dan Carter 
 World Rugby Team of the Year: 
 World Rugby Coach of the Year: Michael Cheika  
 World Rugby Breakthrough Player of the Year: Nehe Milner-Skudder 
 World Rugby Women's Player of the Year: Kendra Cocksedge 
 World Rugby Sevens Player of the Year: Werner Kok 
 World Rugby Women's Sevens Player of the Year: Portia Woodman 
 World Rugby Referee Award: Nigel Owens  Wales
 IRPA Try of the Year Julian Savea 
 2015 Rugby World Cup best match moment: 's final try and victory against 
 IRPA Special Merit Award:
 Brian O'Driscoll 
 Nathan Sharpe 
 Award for Character:  Pakistan Rugby Union
 Vernon Pugh Award for Distinguished Service: Nigel Starmer-Smith

2016

 World Rugby Player of the Year: Beauden Barrett 
 World Rugby Team of the Year: 
 World Rugby Coach of the Year: Steve Hansen 
 World Rugby Breakthrough Player of the Year: Maro Itoje 
 World Rugby Women's Player of the Year: Sarah Hunter 
 World Rugby Sevens Player of the Year: Seabelo Senatla 
 World Rugby Women's Sevens Player of the Year: Charlotte Caslick 
 World Rugby Referee Award: Alhambra Nievas  Spain and Rasta Rasivhenge  South Africa
 IRPA Try of the Year: Jamie Heaslip 
 IRPA Special Merit Award: Jean de Villiers 
 Award for Character: Rugby Opens Borders 
 Vernon Pugh Award for Distinguished Service: Syd Millar

2017

 World Rugby Player of the Year: Beauden Barrett 
 World Rugby Team of the Year: 
 World Rugby Coach of the Year: Eddie Jones 
 World Rugby Breakthrough Player of the Year: Rieko Ioane 
 World Rugby Women's Player of the Year: Portia Woodman 
 World Rugby Sevens Player of the Year: Perry Baker 
 World Rugby Women's Sevens Player of the Year: Michaela Blyde 
 World Rugby Referee Award: Joy Neville  
 IRPA Try of the Year: Joaquín Tuculet 
 IRPA Special Merit Award: Richie McCaw  and Rachael Burford 
 Award for Character: Eduardo Oderigo  Argentina
 Vernon Pugh Award for Distinguished Service: Marcel Martin  France

2018
 World Rugby Player of the Year: Johnny Sexton 
 World Rugby Team of the Year: 
 World Rugby Coach of the Year: Joe Schmidt 
 World Rugby Breakthrough Player of the Year: Aphiwe Dyantyi 
 World Rugby Women's Player of the Year: Jessy Tremouliere 
 World Rugby Sevens Player of the Year: Perry Baker 
 World Rugby Women's Sevens Player of the Year: Michaela Blyde 
 World Rugby Referee Award: Angus Gardner  Australia
 IRPA Try of the Year: Brodie Retallick 
 IRPA Special Merit Award: Stephen Moore  and DJ Forbes 
 Award for Character: Doddie Weir  Scotland
 Vernon Pugh Award for Distinguished Service: Yoshirō Mori  Japan

2019
 World Rugby Player of the Year: Pieter-Steph du Toit 
 World Rugby Team of the Year: 
 World Rugby Coach of the Year: Rassie Erasmus 
 World Rugby Breakthrough Player of the Year: Romain Ntamack 
 World Rugby Women's Player of the Year: Emily Scarratt 
 World Rugby Sevens Player of the Year: Jerry Tuwai 
 World Rugby Women's Sevens Player of the Year: Ruby Tui 
 World Rugby Referee Award: Wayne Barnes  England 
 IRPA Try of the Year: TJ Perenara 
 IRPA Special Merit Award: Jamie Heaslip 
 Award for Character: Kamaishi 
 Vernon Pugh Award for Distinguished Service: Bernard Lapasset  France

2020 
Fan Awards

 Men’s 15s Player of the Decade - Richie McCaw 
 Women’s 15s Player of the Decade - Jessy Trémoulière 
 Men’s Sevens Player of the Decade - Jerry Tuwai 
 Women’s Sevens Player of the Decade - Portia Woodman 
 IRP Men’s 15s Try of the Decade - Jamie Heaslip 
 IRP Women’s 15s Try of the Decade - Portia Woodman 

World Rugby Awards Panel Choice

 Women’s 15s Team of the Decade

 Rochelle Clark 
 Fiao’o Fa'amausili 
 Sophie Hemming 
 Eloise Blackwell 
 Tamara Taylor 
 Linda Itunu 
 Maggie Alphonsi 
 Safi N’Diaye 
 Kendra Cocksedge 
 Katy Daley-McLean 
 Portia Woodman 
 Kelly Brazier 
 Emily Scarratt 
 Lydia Thompson 
 Danielle Waterman 

 Men’s 15s Team of the Decade

 Tendai Mtawarira 
 Bismarck du Plessis 
 Owen Franks 
 Brodie Retallick 
 Sam Whitelock 
 David Pocock 
 Richie McCaw 
 Sergio Parisse 
 Conor Murray 
 Dan Carter 
 Bryan Habana 
 Ma’a Nonu 
 Brian O’Driscoll 
 George North 
 Ben Smith 

Celebrating Rugby's Heroes of COVID-19

Due to the effects of COVID-19, members of the rugby family did all they could to help.

 Maxime Mbanda
 Sarah Hunter
 Tapfuma Parirenyatwa
 New Zealand Rugby players
 Canada sevens players
 James Acker
 Springboks players
 Tess Feury
 Bakary Meité
 Shailen Tudu
 Jamie Roberts

2021
 World Rugby Men's 15s Player of the Year: Antoine Dupont 
 World Rugby Women’s 15s Player of the Year: Zoe Aldcroft 
 World Rugby Men’s Sevens Player of the Year: Marcos Moneta 
 World Rugby Women's Sevens Player of the Year: Anne-Cécile Ciofani 
 Vernon Pugh Award for Distinguished Service: Jacques Laurans  France
 World Rugby Coach of the Year: Simon Middleton 
 World Rugby Breakthrough Player of the Year: Will Jordan 
 International Rugby Players Men's Try of the Year: Damian Penaud 
 International Rugby Players Women's Try of the Year: Emilie Boulard 
 World Rugby Referee Award: Andrew Cole  Australia

Dream Team 

 World Rugby Women's 15s Dream Team of the Year
 Annaëlle Deshayes 
 Agathe Sochat 
 Sarah Bern 
 Safi N’Diaye 
 Abbie Ward 
 Zoe Aldcroft 
 Karen Paquin 
 Poppy Cleall 
 Laure Sansus 
 Caroline Drouin 
 Abigail Dow 
 Beatrice Rigoni 
 Stacey Fluhler 
 Caroline Boujard 
 Jasmine Joyce 

 World Rugby Men's 15s Dream Team of the Year
 Wyn Jones 
 Malcolm Marx 
 Tadhg Furlong 
 Maro Itoje 
 Eben Etzebeth 
 Siya Kolisi 
 Michael Hooper 
 Ardie Savea 
 Antoine Dupont 
 Beauden Barrett 
 Makazole Mapimpi 
 Samu Kerevi 
 Lukhanyo Am 
 Will Jordan 
 Stuart Hogg

2022 

 World Rugby Men's 15s Player of the Year: Josh van der Flier 
 World Rugby Women’s 15s Player of the Year: Ruahei Demant 
 World Rugby Coach of the Year: Wayne Smith  
 World Rugby Men’s 15s Breakthrough Player of the Year: Ange Capuozzo 
 World Rugby Women’s Breakthrough Player of the Year: Ruby Tui 
 World Rugby Men’s Sevens Player of the Year: Terry Kennedy 
 World Rugby Women’s Sevens Player of the Year: Charlotte Caslick  
 World Rugby Referee Award: Tappe Henning 
 Vernon Pugh Award for Distinguished Service: Farah Palmer 
 International Rugby Players Special Merit Award: Bryan Habana 
 International Rugby Players Men’s Try of the Year: Rodrigo Fernández  (vs USA on 9 July)
 International Rugby Players Women’s Try of the Year: Abby Dow  (vs Canada on 5 November)

Dream Team 

 World Rugby Women's 15s Dream Team of the Year
 Hope Rogers 
 Emily Tuttosi 
 Sarah Bern 
 Abbie Ward  
 Madoussou Fall 
 Alex Matthews 
 Marlie Packer 
 Sophie de Goede 
 Laure Sansus  
 Ruahei Demant 
 Ruby Tui 
 Theresa Fitzpatrick 
 Emily Scarratt 
 Portia Woodman 
 Abby Dow 

 World Rugby Men's 15s Dream Team of the Year
 Ellis Genge 
 Malcolm Marx 
 Tadhg Furlong 
 Tadhg Beirne 
 Sam Whitelock 
 Pablo Matera 
 Josh van der Flier 
 Grégory Alldritt 
 Antoine Dupont  
 Johnny Sexton  
 Marika Koroibete  
 Damian de Allende  
 Lukhanyo Am  
 Will Jordan  
 Freddie Steward

References

External links

 
Awards established in 2001